Hale County Airport  is a public airport about  south-southwest of Plainview, Texas.  There are no airline flights now.

History
Provided contract glider training to the United States Army Air Forces, 1942–1944. Training provided by Clint Breedlove Aerial Service. An all-way turf airfield with a 2,700' x 2,700' landing/takeoff area. Used primarily C-47 Skytrains and Waco CG-4 unpowered gliders.  Possibly had two auxiliary landing airfields. The mission of the school was to train glider pilot students in proficiency in operation of gliders in various types of towed and soaring flight, both day and night, and in servicing of gliders in the field.

Inactivated during 1944 with the drawdown of AAFTC's pilot training program. Declared surplus and turned over to the Army Corps of Engineers on 30 September 1945. Eventually discharged to the War Assets Administration (WAA) and became a civil airport in April 1946.

Three commercial airlines served Plainview between 1948 and 1963. Pioneer Air Lines began service in January 1948 and ended on April 1, 1955, when the carrier merged into Continental Airlines. Continental then served the airport until 1959 when Central Airlines began service. During 1962, Central operated 516 flight departures but only boarded 148 passengers. Service ended in 1963. All three carriers operated Douglas DC-3 aircraft and provided flights to Amarillo and Lubbock. The Pioneer and Continental flights continued on from Lubbock to Midland/Odessa, San Angelo, Austin, and Houston Hobby Airport. Central Airlines flights continued northbound from Amarillo to Wichita and Kansas City with several stops en route.

See also

 Texas World War II Army Airfields
 31st Flying Training Wing (World War II)

References

 Manning, Thomas A. (2005), History of Air Education and Training Command, 1942–2002.  Office of History and Research, Headquarters, AETC, Randolph AFB, Texas 
 Shaw, Frederick J. (2004), Locating Air Force Base Sites, History’s Legacy, Air Force History and Museums Program, United States Air Force, Washington DC.

External links
 
 

1942 establishments in Texas
Airports established in 1942
USAAF Contract Flying School Airfields
USAAF Glider Training Airfields
Airfields of the United States Army Air Forces in Texas
Buildings and structures in Hale County, Texas
Transportation in Hale County, Texas